Arzu Göllü (born 1969 in Istanbul) is a retired Turkish volleyball player. She is one of the most talented female volleyball players in Turkish sports history and daughter of Cengiz Göllü, the legendary volleyball player, who also served as the technical director of Turkish National Volleyball Team for many years.

She is 172 cm, and plays as settler. She is signed for Galatasaray Medical Park.

She started her professional career in Eczacıbaşı Istanbul where she played for 9 years, till 2000 and earned her ongoing reputation as the "captain" of the best known volleyball team for females in Turkey.

She also played for Beşiktaş J.K. and Karşıyaka S.K. and she wore the captain strip for Beşiktaş J.K. and Karşıyaka S.K. as well as Eczacıbaşı Istanbul.

She played over 270 times for the Turkish National Volleyball Team during her successful career.

Achievements 
 9 kez'' 'Türk Ligi Şampiyonu: (1985–86, 1986–87, 1987–88, 1988–89, 1993–94, 1994–95, 1998–99, 1999-00, 2000–01)
 3 kere 'türk Kupası Şampiyonu: (1998–99, 1999-00, 2000–01)
 3 kere 'Başkanlar Kupası Şampiyonu: (1988–89, 1990–91, 1992–93)
 Şampiyonu''ve 'Kupa Galipleri Kupası, 1999
 2'nci Sıra 'CEV Kupası, 19933'üncü yerde 'Şampiyon Kulüpler, 2000

See also
 Turkish women in sports

References

External links 
 Player profile at vakifgunes.com

1969 births
Living people
Volleyball players from Istanbul
Turkish women's volleyball players
Eczacıbaşı volleyball players
VakıfBank S.K. volleyballers
Karşıyaka volleyballers
Galatasaray S.K. (women's volleyball) players
21st-century Turkish sportswomen
20th-century Turkish sportswomen